Chinese Romanian or Romanian Chinese may refer to
People's Republic of China–Romania relations
Chinese of Romania
Romanians in China
Eurasian (mixed ancestry) people of Chinese and Romanian descent
People with dual citizenship of China and Romania